Passion Fruit is a lost 1921 silent film south seas romance directed by John Ince and starring  dancer Doraldina. It was produced and distributed by Metro Pictures.

The production was filmed in Monterey, California. There is conflicting information as to the director; some sources list John Ince as director while period adverts have Douglas Gerrard as the director.

Cast
Doraldina - Regina Dominant
Edward Earle - Pierce Lamont
Stuart Holmes - Anders Rance
Sidney Bracey - The Ancient
Florence Turner - Nuanua
W. H. Bainbridge

References

External links
 Passion Fruit at IMDb.com

Southseascinema.org

1921 films
American silent feature films
American black-and-white films
Lost American films
Films directed by John Ince
Metro Pictures films
American romance films
1920s romance films
1920s American films